In his native Israel, between 1960 and 2013, Arik Einstein released 36 studio albums (including children's music), six extended plays (EPs) and eight singles, as well as several albums with groups he was a member of, The Nahal Band, Batzal Yarok, Yarkon Bridge Trio and The High Windows. Throughout his solo career Einstein worked with several artists, often sharing credits on the album.

Albums

Studio albums

Live albums

Compilation albums

Box sets

EPs

Singles

Other appearances

Soundtracks

Various artist compilation albums

Guest appearances

See also
 Batzal Yarok
 Yarkon Bridge Trio
 The High Windows

References

External links

 Discographies of Israeli artists